Luciano de Paolis (born 14 June 1941 in Rome) is an Italian bobsledder who competed in the late 1960s. At the 1968 Winter Olympics in Grenoble, he won gold medals in the two-man and four-man events.

Biography
De Paolis also won a gold medal in the four-man event at the 1970 FIBT World Championships in St. Moritz.

References
 Bobsleigh two-man Olympic medalists 1932-56 and since 1964
 Bobsleigh four-man Olympic medalists for 1924, 1932-56, and since 1964
 Bobsleigh four-man world championship medalists since 1930
 
 Wallechinsky, David (1984). "Bobsled". In The Complete Book of the Olympics: 1896 - 1980. New York: Penguin Books. pp. 559, 561.

External links
 
 
 

1941 births
Sportspeople from Rome
Bobsledders at the 1968 Winter Olympics
Bobsledders at the 1972 Winter Olympics
Italian male bobsledders
Olympic bobsledders of Italy
Olympic gold medalists for Italy
Living people
Olympic medalists in bobsleigh
Medalists at the 1968 Winter Olympics